Khadki railway station or Khadki station is on the Mumbai–Pune railway route. It is owned by central railways department of Indian Railways. Sinhagad Express, Sahyadri Express, Deccan Express, Koyna Express and Mumbai–Chennai Express have their halt at this station. It has four platforms, six lines and one footbridge and is an electrified station. The nearest railway station is Pune railway station and nearest airport is Pune International Airport at Lohegaon (Viman Nagar). The Pichola offers accommodation which is just 4 km away from the station. This is a major halt for military. This makes this an important station on Pune Suburban Railway. This station is to the east of Khadki auto rickshaw stand and is near Khadki Bazaar. This station was built for access to Khadki Cantonment (Kirkee Cantonment). Even today this station is mostly used for Indian Army. The CAFVD Sports Stadium is in front of this railway station which hosts local association football and field hockey matches.

Suburban

 –Lonavala Locals
 Pune Junction–Talegaon Locals
 –Lonavala Local
 Shivajinagar–Talegaon Local

Express/Mails

 Sinhagad Express
 Sahyadri Express
 Deccan Express
 Koyna Express
 Mumbai–Chennai Express
 Mumbai–Chennai Mail

Passengers

 –Karjat–Pune Passenger
 Mumbai–Pandharpur–Mumbai Passenger
 Mumbai–Bijapur–Mumbai Passenger
 Mumbai–Shirdi–Mumbai Passenger

See also
 Khadki
 Pune Suburban Railway
 

Pune Suburban Railway
Railway stations in Pune
Pune railway division